A gating signal is a digital signal or pulse (sometimes called a "trigger") that provides a time window so that a particular event or signal from among many will be selected and others will be eliminated or discarded.

In a multiple input AND/OR gate, a signal at one of the inputs triggers the passage of a signal at other inputs; i.e., it passes through or blocks the signal at other inputs. Such a signal is called a gating signal.

Signal gating means to mask unwanted signal transitions from propagating forward.

Signal processing